Jeonui-myeon is a township of Sejong City, South Korea.

External links
 Jeonui-myeon 

Towns and townships in Sejong